Hilary Tindall (14 August 1938 - 5 December 1992) was an English stage and television actress. She is best remembered for the role of Ann Hammond in the BBC television series The Brothers.

Tindall trained at the Royal Academy of Dramatic Art and during her career appeared in such television programmes as The Champions, The Baron, Randall and Hopkirk (Deceased), Emergency - Ward 10, The Brothers, The Fall and Rise of Reginald Perrin, The Cuckoo Waltz, Z-Cars, Max Headroom: 20 Minutes into the Future, Tales of the Unexpected and A Kind of Loving. She also acted in Terence Donovan's rarely seen action film Yellow Dog in 1973.

She starred in Derek Nimmo's Far East tour of The Man Most Likely To with Leslie Phillips and a young Elizabeth Hurley.

Personal life
Hilary Tindall died of bowel cancer at her home in Selborne, Hampshire, in 1992. She was survived by her husband, Robin Lowe, the son of actor John Loder, and her two children, Kate Slesinger (née Lowe) and Julian Lowe. Kate Slesinger has 3 daughters, Allegra, Daphne and Ava. Julian Lowe has a daughter called Martha.

References

External links

Biography by Colin Baker

1938 births
1992 deaths
Actresses from Manchester
Alumni of RADA
Deaths from cancer in England
Deaths from colorectal cancer
English stage actresses
English television actresses
20th-century British actresses
People from Selborne
20th-century English women
20th-century English people